Daniel Savini (born 26 September 1997) is an Italian cyclist, who currently rides for UCI Continental team .

Major results

2015
 1st  Overall Giro della Lunigiana
1st  Mountains classification
1st Stage 1
 2nd Trofeo Città di Loano
 7th Trofeo Emilio Paganessi
2016
 10th Giro del Belvedere
2017
 4th Giro del Belvedere
2018
 10th Overall Oberösterreichrundfahrt
1st  Young rider classification
2019
 3rd Trofeo Matteotti
2020
 3rd Trofeo Matteotti
2021
 6th Overall Istrian Spring Trophy

References

External links

1997 births
Living people
Italian male cyclists
Sportspeople from Lucca
Cyclists from Tuscany